Simon John Forrest (born 2 August 1969) is a former rugby league and rugby union player who currently serves on the board of the Crusaders. He is the husband of Commonwealth Games medalist Anna Simcic.

Playing career

Rugby Union
Forrest played for the Crusaders in 1996, and for London Scottish F.C. from 1998 to 1999.

Rugby League
Forrest made his debut for the South Sydney Rabbitohs in the 1998 season, in their round 9 game against the North Sydney Bears.

Post-playing career
Forrest served as co-coach of the New Zealand universities rugby union squad from 2014 to 2019.

References

New Zealand rugby league players
New Zealand rugby union players
Living people
1969 births
South Sydney Rabbitohs players
Crusaders (rugby union) players